Serra Azul de Minas is a Brazilian municipality located in the state of Minas Gerais. The city belongs to the mesoregion Metropolitana de Belo Horizonte and to the microregion of Conceição do Mato Dentro.  As of 2020, the estimated population was 4,292.

The municipality contains part of the  Pico do Itambé State Park, created in 1998.

See also
 List of municipalities in Minas Gerais

References

Municipalities in Minas Gerais